Paranormal challenges, often posed by groups or individuals who self-identify as skeptics or rationalists, publicly challenge those who claim to possess paranormal abilities to demonstrate that they in fact possess them, and are not fraudulent or self-deceptive.

Process 

After establishing procedures and measures of success agreed upon beforehand between the challengers and the claimants, a challenge is usually divided into two steps, the first being a "preliminary test" or "pre-test", where claimants can show their purported abilities under controlled conditions before a small audience, before being admitted to the final test. Sometimes these pre-tests have a smaller prize attached to them. Several local organisations have set up challenges that serve as pre-tests to larger prizes such as the JREF's One Million Dollar Paranormal Challenge or the 2012–2013 SKEPP Sisyphus Prize (for one million euros).

History 
In 1922, Scientific American made two US$2,500 offers: (1) for the first authentic spirit photograph made under test conditions, and (2) for the first psychic to produce a "visible psychic manifestation." Harry Houdini was a member of the investigating committee. The first medium to be tested was George Valiantine, who claimed that in his presence spirits would speak through a trumpet that floated around a darkened room. For the test, Valiantine was placed in a room, the lights were extinguished, but unbeknownst to him his chair had been rigged to light a signal in an adjoining room if he left his seat. Because the light signals were tripped during his performance - indicating that he did leave his seat multiple times, sometimes for up to eighteen seconds - Valiantine was confirmed to be a fraud, and did not collect the award money.

Since then, many individuals and groups have offered similar monetary awards for proof of the paranormal in an observed setting. Indian rationalist Abraham Kovoor's challenge in 1963 inspired American skeptic James Randi's prize in 1964, which became the One Million Dollar Paranormal Challenge. In 2003, these prizes were calculated to have a combined value of US$2,326,500. , none of the prizes have been awarded. The James Randi paranormal challenge was officially terminated in 2015. As of 2018, these prizes combine to approximately US$1,024,215. However, they take place in multiple countries and the conditions to be met may vary considerably.

List of standing prizes

List of defunct prizes

Notes

References

Further reading 
  (1975), Mediums, Mystics & the Occult. Thomas Y. Crowell Co.
   (1988), Parariteiten – een kritische blik op het paranormale. Het Spectrum.
  (2006), Entangled Minds: Extrasensory Experiences in a Quantum Reality. Paraview Pocket Books.

Prizes for proof of paranormal phenomena
Articles containing video clips